The Brazil national rugby union team, nicknamed Tupis, is controlled by the Brazilian Rugby Confederation. Brazil is one of the founding unions of CONSUR (now Sudamérica Rugby) and played in the inaugural South American tournament. Brazil has not qualified for a Rugby World Cup, but participated in the first edition of rugby 7s in the Olympics. Brazil currently ranks 4th in South America (behind Argentina, Chile and Uruguay) and 6th in the Americas region.

Rugby union in Brazil has a long history, dating back to the late 19th century when British immigrants brought the game to Brazil's urban ports. Despite Brazil's success in association football, Brazil has historically been one of the weakest teams of the Americas, having less success than that of Argentina or  Uruguay.

In the 21st century, efforts were made to revitalize the sport in Brazil. With rugby sevens being added to the Olympic calendar, Brazil was invited to the World Rugby Sevens Series, showing improvement in both the men's and women's series. In 2016, a meeting with the unions of Argentina, Brazil, Canada, Chile, the United States and Uruguay established the Americas Rugby Championship, meant to mirror the Six Nations and The Rugby Championship, and give consistent tests to the top teams in the region. After 3 close games, two of which Brazil came close to victory, Brazil beat the USA Eagles, 24–23, their first victory in the championship, as well as over the United States and a Tier Two nation. Brazil later went to have its first victories over Belgium and Portugal, marking the first time the team beat any European side and, later, a historical win against Argentina XV. This latter game, along with two wins against Chile and Colombia, secured Brazil its first South American Rugby Championship title, in 2018.

History

Beginnings: 19th Century to 1949
The very first instance of rugby being played in Brazil dates back to the late 19th century. British immigrants arriving in Brazil brought the game to various port cities in Brazil. These immigrants set up various athletic clubs which doubled with association football. The first recorded instance of a rugby game being played in Brazil was 1891, played by the São Paulo Athletic Club, under the auspices of Charles William Miller. Future efforts to promote the game were then taken on by Augusto Shaw, after Miller began to devote himself exclusively to football.

During the 1920s and 1930s, rugby began to flourish somewhat in Brazil, although it did not enjoy the widespread exposure as football. For the most part, rugby was primarily restricted to those who had British descent, or with some other connection to Britain. In 1926, a proper domestic competition was established. By 1932, a national side had formed; Brazil played its first ever national game against South Africa XV, losing by an unknown margin. The sport suffered a setback when an attempt to get it recognized as a national sport was denied, since rugby was limited to only four states than the required five. World War II suspended operations from 1941 to 1946, as was the case in many countries.

1950s to 1990s
Brazil participated in the first ever South American Rugby Championship, but lost all three of their fixtures. They were shut out 68 and 72 to zero against Chile and Argentina respectively, while Brazil played a closer game against Uruguay, losing 10 – 17. During the 1950s, organization of rugby in Brazil was sporadic; there was no official high governing union at the time, and the national side was only organized by Jimmy Macintyre, who ran the SPAC. Brazil would not play another test until 1961. The modern day Brazilian Rugby Confederation (CBRu) was founded in 1963, in order to govern the game more efficiently in the country. The first president of the CBRu was Harry Donovan. In 1964, Brazil finished runner-up in the South American Rugby Championship, tying Chile 16–16 and defeating Uruguay 15–8.

In the 1970s the better structure of rugby allowed the game to be introduced to Brazilians outside of the British-descended community. Brazil experienced somewhat of an expansion in rugby; the game was introduced to universities throughout the country, and Brazil was becoming a destination for rugby tours. In 1974, Brazil played a test match against France, losing by a margin of 7–99. For the rest of the decade Brazil played against its South American neighbors; Brazil frequently beat minnows Paraguay during this period.

In 1985, France toured Brazil again, but this time Brazil played much more valiantly, losing by a score of 6–41. Brazil is a charter member of CONSUR (now Sudámerica Rugby), founded in 1989. Despite this, Brazil did not officially join the IRB until 1995, and did not participate in qualifying tournaments until then. However, their first fixture in the qualifiers was a disaster; Brazil was humiliated by Trinidad and Tobago by a score of 41–0, swiftly ending their campaign.

2000s: the new century
Brazil began the 2000s with much more success. In 2000, Brazil easily won the 2000 edition of the SARC; they repeated this in 2001, topping the group of Colombia, Peru, and Venezuela. Brazil advanced to the next round of qualifying, disposing of Trinidad and Tobago; Brazil would go on to lose their final games, but Brazil was finally starting to close the gap. Throughout the 2000s, Brazil began winning more of its games, and in 2008, finally broke through; Brazil beat Paraguay to finally advance to the top flight of the SARC, their first time there since 1989. Brazil further repeated this by beating Paraguay again in 2009.

In 2012, the New York Times reported that rugby was Brazil's second fastest growing sport, behind MMA. This is partly due to World Rugby re-investing in Brazil due to the reinstatement of rugby in the 2016 Olympics. Since then, Brazil has been invited to the World Rugby Sevens Series, allowing Brazil to improve against higher competition.

In 2014, Brazil recorded its first-ever victory over Chile, defeating the Condores 24 to 16. Since initiatives were taken in 2009, the character of rugby has changed in Brazil; the registration numbers have risen, and the sport has successfully formed sponsorships with companies such as Bradesco, many of whom see Brazilian rugby to be profitable in the future.

In 2015, Brazil played two tests against the national team of Germany, one held in Pacaembu Stadium; these performances attracted 10,000 spectators, being one of the highest attendances for rugby in Brazil. Brazil's improved form showed in 2016 in the first edition of the Americas Rugby Championship, where Brazil was on the verge of historic victories against Chile and Uruguay, but could not hold on. After scoring 25 points in their first ever fixture versus Canada, Brazil went on to upset the United States 24–23 in Pacaembu; Brazil proceeded to finish off the tournament losing 7–41 to Argentina, scoring their first try against Argentina in decades.

For the 2016 South American Rugby Championship "A", RedeTV!, one of Brazil's major TV networks, will air Brazil's games live. Brazil played Uruguay at Allianz Parque in São Paulo, one of the largest stadiums to ever host a rugby game in Brazil. Brazil tied 20–20 against Chile, further signaling their rise to the top in South America. To cap off the tournament, Brazil beat Paraguay 32–21, finishing in third place only behind Chile on points difference.

Brazil improved in the 2017 edition of the ARC, beating Chile convincingly 17 to 3, before notching their first win in only their second meeting against Canada in Pacaembu, by the score of 24 to 23. After these victories, Brazil rose to 30th, their first time in the top 30 of the World Rugby Rankings since 2009. On November 18, 2017, Brazil won on European soil for the first time in history, defeating Belgium and Portugal, further showing their progress in the 2010s. Brazil's progress continued as they beat Chile on their home soil for the first time in history, and later in the year, in the reformed 2018 South American Rugby Championship, defeated Argentina XV, marking their first-ever victory over an Argentinean side. Brazil would go onto defeat Colombia and was crowned South American champions for the first time in their history.

Uniforms
Traditionally, the rugby team of Brazil has worn a strip of a yellow top and green shorts while the away strip consists of a green top and white shorts. The current provider of the kit is local based Topper. In 2015, the shorts were changed to blue, to be consistent with that of Brazil's football team; this included a presentation involving the Tupí tribe, whom the team is nicknamed after. The current shirt sponsor of Brazil is Bradesco.

Nickname
For some time, Brazilian national rugby union side was unofficially associated with Walt Disney's character Zé Carioca. Sometime later, CBRu, still known as Associação Brasileira de Rugby, or simply ABR, chose Vitória Régia as its official emblem and nickname. However, this nickname was not adopted by fans.

In March 2012, CBRu announced Os Tupis as Brazil national rugby union team's official nickname, a reference to Tupi people, the main ethnic group of Brazilian indigenous people. The choice for an emblem started in 2010, when CBRu started receiving e-mails with several suggestions. The three finalists were Tupis, Sucuris (Anacondas) and Araras (Macaws). Fans voted on an Internet poll and chose Tupis with 47% (4,387 votes) of preference. According to CBRu's former president (from 2012-2016), Sami Arap, "The choice ratified the roots of Brazilian people. Tupi represents the essence of our country, referring to [our] strength, perseverance, loyalty and team spirit".

Tournament records

Rugby World Cup

Americas Rugby Championship

The Americas Rugby Championship was held in five of the seven years from 2009 to 2015, but Brazil did not participate. Brazil along with Chile has participated in an expanded six-country Americas Rugby Championship in 2016. In the 2016 ARC, 42nd ranked Brazil defeated the 16th ranked United States 24–23, their first win against the United States.

South American Championship

Overall record
Below is table of the representative rugby matches played by a Brazil national XV at test level up until 16 March 2018.

Current squad 
Brazil's 26-man squad up for the World Rugby test matches against Zimbabwe and Namibia or Zimbabwe.

Head Coach:  Fernando Portugal
 Caps updated: 15 November 2021

Titles
 South American Rugby Championship: 2018

Notable players
 In 2011 Lucas "Tanque" Duque and his brother Moisés Duque were given trials with professional teams in France.
 Since 2015 Luiz Vieira has been playing for the second team of the TOP14 team Oyonnax.

Media coverage
Before 2016, most of Brazil's games were aired through SporTV, a paid television network. In 2016, changes were made to Brazil's broadcasting; more commonly available RedeTV! would air games involving the South American Rugby Championship, while ESPN Brasil holds the rights to the Americas Rugby Championship.

See also
 Rugby union in Brazil
 Brazil national rugby sevens team
 Brazilian Rugby Confederation
 South American Rugby Championship
 Americas Rugby Championship
 Brazil U20

References

External links
 Confederação Brasileira de Rugby – Official Site
 Brazil  on Rugbydata.com
 Portal do Rugby Brazilian rugby news 
 RugbyMania.com.br Brazilian look at Rugby News (Portuguese)
 RugbySpirit.com.br Info on Brazilian Rugby (Portuguese)
  rugby blog on Globo.com
 

 
South American national rugby union teams
Rugby union in Brazil
Rugby union
Rugby clubs established in 1932
1932 establishments in Brazil